Søren Peter Christensen (30 October 1884 – 12 October 1927) was a Danish gymnast who competed in the 1912 Summer Olympics. He was part of the Danish team, which won the silver medal in the gymnastics men's team, Swedish system event.

References

External links
profile

1884 births
1927 deaths
Danish male artistic gymnasts
Gymnasts at the 1912 Summer Olympics
Olympic gymnasts of Denmark
Olympic silver medalists for Denmark
Olympic medalists in gymnastics
Medalists at the 1912 Summer Olympics